German submarine U-579 was a Type VIIC U-boat of Nazi Germany's Kriegsmarine during World War II.

She carried out no patrols and sank no ships.

She was sunk in the Kattegat by a British aircraft on 5 May 1945.

Design
German Type VIIC submarines were preceded by the shorter Type VIIB submarines. U-579 had a displacement of  when at the surface and  while submerged. She had two shafts and two  propellers.

U-579 was fitted with five  torpedo tubes (four fitted at the bow and one at the stern), fourteen torpedoes, one  SK C/35 naval gun, 220 rounds, and a  C/30 anti-aircraft gun. The boat had a complement of between forty-four and sixty.

Service history
The submarine was laid down on 31 August 1940 at Blohm & Voss, Hamburg as yard number 555, launched on 28 May 1941 and commissioned on 17 July under the command of Kapitänleutnant Dietrich Lohmann.

She served with the 5th U-boat Flotilla from 17 July 1941, the 24th flotilla from 27 May 1942, the 23rd flotilla from 1 September 1943 and the 4th flotilla from 1 March 1945, all for training.

The boat was decommissioned on 12 October 1941 after a fire in the forward torpedo compartment. She was recommissioned on 27 May 1942 after repair.

Fate
U-579 was sunk in the Kattegat east of Aarhus in Denmark on 5 May 1945 by depth charges from a British B-24 Liberator of No. 547 Squadron RAF.

Twenty-four men died with U-579; the number of survivors is not known.

References

Bibliography

External links

German Type VIIC submarines
U-boats commissioned in 1941
U-boats sunk in 1945
U-boats sunk by British aircraft
U-boats sunk by depth charges
World War II submarines of Germany
World War II shipwrecks in the Kattegat
1941 ships
Ships built in Hamburg
Maritime incidents in May 1945